Max-A-Million was an American musical group from Chicago that consisted of singers A'Lisa B., Duran Estevez, and Tommye, active from 1994 to 1998. They released one album which contained four singles, three of which charted on the US Billboard Hot 100, including a cover of Marvin Gaye's "Sexual Healing". In May 2021, the group released a single titled “What You Do”, now on all main streaming services.

Discography

Studio albums

Singles

References

Musical groups from Chicago
Musical groups established in 1994
Musical groups disestablished in 1998
1994 establishments in Illinois